The Baojun 510 is a subcompact crossover SUV produced by SAIC-GM-Wuling through the Baojun brand.

Overview 
The 510 debuted at the 2016 Guangzhou Auto Show with the official Chinese market launch in 2017. The car is positioned under the 530/560 compact crossover at the time.

It was the best-selling crossover in China in 2018, and also the best-selling car sold by Baojun. , nearly 800,000 units of 510 had been sold. It is also notable for being the highest-selling newly-introduced automobile nameplate in world's history. It recorded 416,883 sales during its first 12 months in market, the highest ever in the world. It took the record from the Baojun 560 which was sold 319,536 units in a 12-month period.

Facelift 
In July 2019, the 510 received its facelift with an updated grille, rear fascia, and the availability of CVT option with three driving modes.

Export markets 

In 2020, SAIC-GM-Wuling began exporting the facelifted 510 to Latin America under the Chevrolet Groove nameplate. It is also exported to the Middle East and Mexico since late 2021.

Replacement 
In late 2019, Baojun introduced the RS-3, which acted as the successor to the 510, but sold alongside it as a premium option.

Sales

References

External links 

  (in Chinese)
 Chevrolet Groove (Chile) (rebadged Baojun 510)

510
Cars introduced in 2016
2020s cars
Mini sport utility vehicles
Crossover sport utility vehicles
Front-wheel-drive vehicles
Vehicles with CVT transmission
Cars of China